Donald James Yarmy (April 13, 1923 – September 25, 2005), known professionally as Don Adams, was an American actor. In his five decades on television, he was best known as bumbling Maxwell Smart (Secret Agent 86) in the television situation comedy Get Smart (1965–1970, 1995), which he also sometimes directed and wrote. Adams won three consecutive Emmy Awards for his performance in the series (1967–1969). Adams also provided the voices for the animated series Tennessee Tuxedo and His Tales (1963–1966) and Inspector Gadget (1983–1986) as well as several revivals and spinoffs of the latter in the 1990s.

Early life
Adams was born Donald James Yarmy in Manhattan, New York, a son of William Yarmy and his wife, Consuelo ( Deiter) Yarmy. His father was of Hungarian Jewish descent and his mother was Irish-American. Donald and his brother Dick Yarmy were each raised in the religion of one parent: Don in the Catholic faith of their mother, and Dick in the Jewish faith of their father. The brothers had an elder sister, Gloria Ella Yarmy (later Gloria Burton), a writer who wrote an episode of Get Smart. Dropping out of New York City's DeWitt Clinton High School, he worked as a theater usher. He later remarked that he had "little use for school."

World War II service 
Late in 1941, he joined the United States Marine Corps. Yarmy reported to the First Training Battalion in New River, North Carolina, and then was assigned to I Company of the Third Battalion, Eighth Marines in San Diego. 

In May 1942, Yarmy's unit was transported to Samoa for further training, and then participated in the Battle of Guadalcanal in August 1942 in the Pacific Theater of Operations. During an assault on the Japanese naval base at the nearby island of Tulagi, which was fiercely defended, Yarmy was seriously wounded by a Japanese sniper. He subsequently contracted blackwater fever, a serious complication of malaria, known for a 90% rate of fatality, and his recovery was hampered by horrendous conditions in the battlefield. He did not expect to recover. Yarmy was evacuated and then hospitalized for more than a year at a Navy hospital in Wellington, New Zealand. He was awarded the Purple Heart. After his recovery, Yarmy served as a Marine Drill Instructor in the United States, holding the rank of corporal. He was as an expert marksman and was noted for his competence.

Career

Early career
After his discharge in 1945, Yarmy went to Florida and worked as a comic in a strip club, doing impersonations of celebrities, but he refused to do "blue" material and was fired. In 1947 he married Adelaide Constance Efantis (1924–2016), nicknamed "Dell", a singer who performed as Adelaide Adams. He decided to take her name because performers were called up for auditions in alphabetical order. Adams also worked as a commercial artist and restaurant cashier to help support his wife and three daughters.

Adams' work on television began in 1954 when he won on Arthur Godfrey's Talent Scouts with a stand-up comedy act written by boyhood friend Bill Dana.  In the late 1950s, he made eleven appearances on The Steve Allen Show, where Dana was part of the writing team. During the 1961–1963 television seasons, he was a regular on NBC's The Perry Como Show as part of The Kraft Music Hall Players. He had a role on the NBC sitcom The Bill Dana Show (1963–65) as a bumbling hotel detective named Byron Glick.

Get Smart

Creators Mel Brooks and Buck Henry, prompted by producers Daniel Melnick and David Susskind, wrote Get Smart as the comedic answer to the successful 1960s spy television dramas such as The Man from U.N.C.L.E., The Avengers, I Spy and others. They were asked to write a spoof that combined elements from two of the most popular film series at the time: James Bond and The Pink Panther (Inspector Clouseau).

Get Smart was written as a vehicle for Tom Poston, to be piloted on ABC; when ABC turned it down, NBC picked up the show and cast Adams in the role because he was already under contract. When Get Smart debuted in 1965, it was an immediate hit. Barbara Feldon co-starred as Max's young and attractive partner (later wife) Agent 99. They had great chemistry throughout the show's run, despite a 10-year age difference, and they became best friends during and after.

Adams gave the character a clipped speaking style borrowed from actor William Powell. Feldon said, "Part of the pop fervor for Agent 86 was because Don did such an extreme portrayal of the character that it made it easy to imitate." Adams created many popular catchphrases (some of which were in his act before the show), including "Sorry about that, Chief", "Ahh ... the old [noun] in the [noun] trick.  That's the [number]th time this [month/week]." (sometimes the description of the trick was simply, "Ahh... the old [noun] trick."), and "Missed it by 'that much'".

Adams also produced and directed 13 episodes of the show. He was nominated for Emmys four seasons in a row, from 1966 to 1969, for Outstanding Continued Performance by an Actor in a Leading Role in a Comedy Series. He won the award three times. The show moved to CBS for its final season, with ratings declining, as spy series went out of fashion. Get Smart was canceled in 1970 after 138 episodes.

Typecasting
Following this, Adams then wanted to move on to other projects. His efforts after Get Smart were less successful, including the comedy series The Partners (1971–72), a game show called Don Adams' Screen Test (1975–76, see below), and three attempts to revive the Get Smart series in the 1980s. His movie The Nude Bomb (1980) was unsuccessful at the box office. Adams had been typecast as Maxwell Smart and was unable to escape the image, although he had success as the voice of the title character of Inspector Gadget.

He earned most of his income from his work on stage and in nightclubs. As Adams had chosen a low salary combined with a one-third ownership stake in Get Smart during the show's production, he received a regular income for many years due to the show's popularity in reruns.

Don Adams' Screen Test

Don Adams' Screen Test is a syndicated game show which lasted 26 episodes during the 1975–76 season.  The show was filmed in two 15-minute segments, in each of which a randomly selected audience member would "act" to re-create a scene from a Hollywood movie as accurately as possible.

Such moments as the bar scene from The Lost Weekend, the duel scene from The Prisoner of Zenda or the beach scene from From Here to Eternity were used, with Adams directing and a celebrity guest playing the other lead in the scene. Hokey effects, bad timing, forgotten lines, prop failures and the celebrity's "ad-libs" were maximized for comic effect as the audience watched "bloopers" and "outtakes" as they happened. At the end of the program, the final, serious, fully edited version of the "screen test" of each of the two contestants would be played, with audience reaction determining the winner, who would receive a trip to Hollywood and a real screen test for a motion picture.

Later work

Adams resurrected the Maxwell Smart character for a series of television commercials for Savemart, a retail chain that sold audio and video equipment. He also did a series of audio/radio commercials in the 1980s for Chief Auto Parts, a retail automobile parts establishment later sold to AutoZone.

He also appeared in the film Jimmy the Kid (1982) and played a cameo role as a harbormaster in Back to the Beach (1987).

Adams attempted a situation-comedy comeback in Canada with Check it Out! in 1985. Set in a supermarket, the show ran for three years but was not successful in the United States. The show also starred Gordon Clapp, an unknown actor at the time, who developed a rapport with Adams.

In 1995, Adams reprised his Maxwell Smart role one last time on Get Smart for Fox; it co-starred Barbara Feldon and rising star Andy Dick as Max and 99's son. Unlike the original version, this show did not appeal to younger viewers, and it was canceled after just seven episodes.  One of Adams's last public appearances was at the Get Smart Gathering on November 7, 2003, at a North Hollywood restaurant, in which fans of the show joined the cast and some of the creative talent of the series.

Adams was the voice of the title character in Tennessee Tuxedo and His Tales (1963–66), with his bombastic catchphrase "Tennessee Tuxedo will not fail!" Later, he voiced himself in animated form for a guest shot in an episode of Hanna-Barbera's The New Scooby-Doo Movies, titled "The Exterminator". His most notable voiceover work was that of the title character in Inspector Gadget. He voiced the character in the original television series (1983–85) and a 1992 Christmas special, as well as in subsequent 1990s spinoffs Gadget Boy and Inspector Gadget's Field Trip. He retired from voicing Inspector Gadget in 1999.

His last roles were the character of Principal Hickey in the late-1990s/early-2000s Disney cartoon Pepper Ann, Ranger Rudy in Fisher-Price CD-ROM game Outdoor Adventures: Ranger Trail, and the voice of Brain the Dog in the end credits for the 1999 film version of Inspector Gadget.

Personal life
At the time of his enlistment in the U.S. Marines, he listed "none" on the section of the form asking about religion. During his difficult recovery from blackwater fever, he returned to his Catholic faith as he prayed to survive.

Adams divorced Adelaide in 1960 and married Dorothy Bracken, an actress.  He left Bracken in 1977 to marry actress Judy Luciano, with whom he had one child. That marriage also ended in divorce. He had seven children: Carolyn, Christine, Cathy, Cecily, Stacey, Sean, and Beige.  Cecily died of lung cancer in 2004 and his son Sean died in 2006 at age 35 of a brain tumor, a year after Don Adams's death.

His brother Richard Paul Yarmy, also known as Dick Yarmy (February 14, 1932 – May 5, 1992), was an actor. His sister Gloria Yarmy Burton was a writer. Robert Karvelas, who played the role of Agent Larabee on Get Smart, was Adams' cousin on his mother's side of the family.

An avid gambler, according to his longtime friend Bill Dana, Adams "could be very devoted to his family if you reminded him about it, [but] Don's whole life was focused around gambling."

Death
Adams died on September 25, 2005, at Cedars-Sinai Medical Center in Los Angeles, California.  He suffered from lymphoma and a lung infection. His health had declined after the death of his daughter Cecily. Before his death, Adams had joked about not wanting a mournful funeral, preferring, he said, to have his friends get together "and bring me back to life."

Among his eulogists were his decades-long friends Barbara Feldon, Don Rickles, James Caan, Bill Dana, and his son-in-law, actor Jim Beaver (widower of Adams' daughter Cecily). His funeral Mass was held at the Church of the Good Shepherd in Beverly Hills. He is interred in Hollywood Forever Cemetery.

Filmography

Film

Television

References

External links

 
 
 Profile, laughterlog.com
 Associated Press obituary. legacy.com

1923 births
2005 deaths
American stand-up comedians
American male film actors
American game show hosts
American male television actors
American male voice actors
United States Marine Corps personnel of World War II
American people of Irish descent
American people of Hungarian-Jewish descent
United States Marines
Military personnel from New York City
Burials at Hollywood Forever Cemetery
Deaths from cancer in California
Deaths from lymphoma
DeWitt Clinton High School alumni
Outstanding Performance by a Lead Actor in a Comedy Series Primetime Emmy Award winners
Infectious disease deaths in California
Male actors from New York City
People from Manhattan
20th-century American male actors
Comedians from New York City
20th-century American comedians